Kiss is the second studio album by Canadian singer and songwriter Carly Rae Jepsen. It was released on September 14, 2012, by 604, Schoolboy and Interscope Records. After her debut, Tug of War (2008), which managed to achieve moderate success in Canada but was not released worldwide, Kiss became Jepsen's first internationally released album. Songs on the album are in the nu-disco, dance-pop, and teen pop genres, drawing inspiration from the Cars, Madonna and Robyn. Featuring production from a wide collection of producers including Dallas Austin, Josh Ramsay, and Redfoo, the album features guest vocals from Justin Bieber and Owl City.

Kiss was generally positively reviewed by critics. Critics praised Jepsen for her vocal performance, songwriting, and production. However, they deemed it immature content for her age, which was 26 at the time. The album debuted at number six on the Billboard 200, selling over 46,000 copies in its opening week and debuted at five on the Canadian Albums Chart. It also charted in numerous international markets. The album and its singles earned Jepsen two Grammy Award nominations including Song of the Year, as well as winning Album of the Year and Pop Album of the Year at the Juno Awards of 2013.

Kiss also charted across Europe, Australia, New Zealand, Japan, and the UK, and it has sold more than 1 million copies worldwide as of 2021. Three singles preceded the album;  The lead single "Call Me Maybe" was a massive commercial success, reaching number one in over 15 countries, garnering over 900 million Spotify streams, and sold more than 18 million copies worldwide. The second single, "Good Time", a collaboration with synth-pop artist Owl City, peaked in the top ten also. The third single, "This Kiss", was released in September 2012 and reached top 40 in Canada, while the fourth and final single, "Tonight I'm Getting Over You", was released on February 19, 2013.

Recording
For the recording of Kiss, Jepsen had recorded at a multitude of recording studios such as 2nd Floor Studios, Bieler Bros. Studios, Boiler Room, Darp Studios, Focus Studios, Hipposonic Studios, Kite Productions Studios, London Police Station, MXM Studios, Pagzilla Sound Labs, Party Rock Studio, Pulse Recording, Signalpath Studios, Sky Harbor Studios, Sunset Marquis Studio, The Terrarium, Triangle Sound Studios West, Umbrella Studios.

Singles

"Call Me Maybe", which was an international success, peaked at number one in several countries including Canada and the US, and was released as the lead single internationally on February 22, 2012. The song received generally positive reviews from contemporary critics, who praised its composition and clever lyrical content. After reaching the top position in Canada, Jepsen became only the fifth Canadian artist to do so in her home country since 2007. In the United States, the track reached number one on the Billboard Hot 100 and the Pop Songs chart. The song is the first number one by a Canadian female artist on the Billboard Hot 100 chart since 2007's "Girlfriend" by Avril Lavigne. A music video for "Call Me Maybe" was written and directed by Ben Knechtel. The video received three nominations on the 2012 MuchMusic Video Awards in the categories of UR Fave Video, Pop Video of the Year, and Video of the Year.

The second international single from Kiss, "Good Time" was released on June 26, 2012 and features Owl City. In the US, the song debuted at number 32 on the US Pop Songs chart, and number 18 on the Billboard Hot 100, for the week dated July 4, reaching number eight a few weeks after. The song is the second to make the top ten on the chart for both artists; Owl City's first top ten single since "Fireflies", as well as Carly Rae Jepsen's first top-ten single since "Call Me Maybe", making Jepsen one of the few artists in history to have two top ten songs in the same week. And as of August 29, 2012 the song has sold over one million copies in the United States alone, and was certified Platinum status in that territory. In Canada and New Zealand, it peaked at number one, becoming Owl City's first number-one single and Jepsen's second in both countries. The song debuted at number 17 on the UK Singles Chart on August 26, 2012. The song charted before the single release due to the song being available from Owl City's album, The Midsummer Station. It rose to five the following week, becoming Owl City's first top-five UK hit since 2010's "Fireflies". The music video directed by Declan Whitebloom was released on July 24, 2012 on Owl City's official Vevo. On the same day, Adam Young tweeted about the video saying, "It's always a #goodtime going camping with @CarlyRaeJepsen" with a link to the video on YouTube. The video features both Jepsen and Young. It was filmed in Harriman State Park's Silvermine Picnic Area.

The third international single, "This Kiss", was released on September 10, 2012. It achieved moderate success on the charts, reached at #86 on Billboard Hot 100, and #23 on Canadian Hot 100, being the sixth top 40 hit in Canada.

The single "Almost Said It" was released exclusively on the Canadian iTunes Store as the fourth single in December 2012. The single received no promotion, and did not appear on the charts.

The fourth international single from the album was the fan-favourite "Tonight I'm Getting Over You" which was the lone track produced by Max Martin and Lukas Hilbert. She debuted the song at the 2013 NRJ Music Awards, where she also performed it along with "Call Me Maybe". On January 27, she posted on her Facebook account that she shot the music video in Los Angeles.

"Picture" was released on January 23, 2013, as the fifth and final single from the album exclusively on the Japan iTunes Store to promote the Japanese Tour Edition.

Other songs
Without any disclosure, "Beautiful" reached number 87 on the US Billboard Hot 100, 48 in Australia, 37 in Denmark, 87 in Ireland, 68 in the UK, and 37 on the Canadian Hot 100, becoming Jepsen's seventh top 40 hit in Canada and Bieber's twenty-second top 40 hit in Canada.

Promotion

Televised concerts

To promote the album, Jepsen appeared in several live, awards ceremonies and televised appearances, performing the singles "Call Me Maybe", "Good Time", and "This Kiss". "Call Me Maybe" was performed by Jepsen at the 2012 Billboard Music Awards on May 20, 2012, the 2012 MuchMusic Video Awards on June 17, 2012, the 2012 Teen Choice Awards on July 22, 2012, the 2012 MTV Europe Music Awards on November 11, 2012, and several others.

Alongside synth-pop act Owl City, the Canadian chanteuse sang their collaborative single, "Good Time", on America's Got Talent on August 22, 2012, Today on August 23, 2012, at the US Open's Arthur Ashe Kids' Day on August 25, 2012, The Tonight Show with Jay Leno on August 28, 2012, and Conan on August 29, 2012.

On the drop-date of Kiss, "This Kiss" and "Call Me Maybe" were performed on The Ellen DeGeneres Show. Additional performances of "This Kiss" were held at So You Think You Can Dance on September 18, 2012, 90210s episode "Till Death Do Us Part" on October 8, 2012, and Late Show with David Letterman on October 25, 2012. Jepsen performed "This Kiss", "Your Heart Is a Muscle", "Guitar String / Wedding Ring" and "Call Me Maybe" at the Walmart Soundcheck on September 26, 2012.

Jepsen performed "This Kiss" and "Call Me Maybe" at American Music Awards of 2012 on November 18, 2012. Jepsen performed "This Kiss" and Call Me Maybe" at the halftime show during 100th Grey Cup on November 25, 2012. On December 2, 2012, Jepsen performed at The Big Jingle 2012. Jepsen performed "Call Me Maybe" and "Tonight I'm Getting Over You" at NRJ Music Awards of 2012 on January 26, 2013.

Jepsen performed "Sweetie" on the Shake It Up episode "Fair Librarian It Up", which aired on February 24, 2013.

Believe Tour

Jepsen also promoted the album when opening for Justin Bieber during his Believe Tour in North America, Europe & South America dates. 
During Believe Tour, Jepsen performed "Sweetie", "Tiny Little Bows", "Good Time" with Cody Simpson, "Tonight I'm Getting Over You", "Curiosity", "This Kiss", "Your Heart Is a Muscle", "Hurt So Good", "Call Me Maybe", and "Beautiful" with Bieber.

Summer Kiss Tour
Jepsen further promoted Kiss with her first solo concert tour, the Kiss Summer Tour, which took place in the summer of 2013, from 27 May through October 12, 2013; it began in Jakarta, Indonesia, and ended in Simcoe, Canada.

Critical reception

Following its release, Kiss received mostly positive reviews from music critics with an aggregated metascore of 63 of 100 in Metacritic based on 13 reviews.

The positive reviews came in from AllMusic, Entertainment Weekly, Idolator, Los Angeles Times, Now, PopMatters, Toronto Star and the USA Today. Heather Phares of AllMusic gave the album four out of five stars, saying "After a string of fantastical glamazon pop stars like Rihanna, Lady Gaga, and Nicki Minaj, there's something to be said for Jepsen's girl-next-door persona, which helps make Kiss one of 2012's best, and sweetest, pop albums." AllMusic also named Kiss as one of its top 10 albums of 2012 citing its "solid songwriting and fizzy melodies to prove her success [with 2012-defining single 'Call Me Maybe'] wasn't a fluke." Adam Markovitz of Entertainment Weekly gave the album a B− grade, noting that the album "makes a mad dash for good-enoughness." Sam Lansky of Idolator gave the album four out of five stars, complimenting Jepsen's voice "... and Jepsen's voice proves a surprisingly effective instrument, since she doesn't need an extraordinary range to be one of the more emotive vocalists in the game." Mikael Wood of Los Angeles Times gave it a three out of four stars, evoked how the album "...feels like a successful attempt to invest pheromone-rush dance pop with a bit of old-soul wisdom." Benjamin Boles of Now gave it a four out of five stars, proclaiming the album for containing "...two just okay songs and 14 great ones is better than most acts can manage on their greatest hits packages, let alone their second album." Evan Sawdey of PopMatters gave the album a seven out of ten rating, surmising that "Kiss will not be looked at as one of the all-time great pop albums. Yet song-for-song, Jepsen proves she has more talent than half of the stars out there, managing to not only sell virtually every word on the album but also managing to make it all sound off-the-cuff and effortless, ultimately creating a bubbly pop playground that is both catchy and endearing without having to turn base or crude to get there...If she keeps putting out quality material like virtually all of Kiss, that thankfully will not be the only thing that defines her." Ben Rayner of the Toronto Star gave the album three out of four stars, complimenting it for being "...almost as insidiously easy on the ears," but also criticized its use of the "Call Me Maybe" template: "It's all so bright and immediate and perfectly pleasurable, though, that you don't really realize that you've essentially just listened to the same tune eight times in a row." Rayner ended the review by saying, "Get over the guilt and give in to the pleasure." Brian Mansfield of USA Today rated the album three stars out of four, and said that Carly Rae Jepsen "doesn't always lay herself open the way she does in Call Me Maybe. Much of her album is prefab dance-pop." To this, Mansfield wrote that "There's not another hit like 'Call Me Maybe'. But there's enough substance to ensure she's more than a one-hit wonder."

However, some critics gave it less positive reviews. Jim Farber of the Daily News gave the album a two out of five stars, writing "No doubt Jepsen's handlers know this, but they didn't feel they could risk switching things up. Instead, they confined her more than ever, tethering her to a role that renders Kiss this year's most redundant disc." Caroline Sullivan of The Guardian gave the album two out of five stars, saying "On this album, her voice is still her Achilles' heel; she's a 26-year-old who sounds 16, and a colourless 16 at that." Sullivan however noted that she liked "Beautiful" the most, which she called a "faux-folk ballad" and "a sweet duet with Justin Bieber [...] that suggests that neither artist is completely irredeemable". Blair Kelly of musicOMH gave it two out of five stars, criticizing the album as "a huge disappointment. It could have been a real gem for fans of guilty pleasure pop, but even Taylor Swift comes across as dark and edgy compared to the squeak of this overproduced laziness. Perhaps the global impact of the massive 'Call Me Maybe' is what makes the album as a whole feel like a damp squib, but with or without US Marine parody videos, the rest of the album fizzles out into synth-pop oblivion." Jon Dolan of Rolling Stone gave it two and half out of five stars, stating "...Kiss too often defaults to mediocre dance pop like the Owl City collaboration 'Good Time' – heavy on Disney-fied thump, light on memorable hooks that might highlight her unassuming adorableness." Yorgo Douramacos of Slant Magazine gave it two and a half out of five stars, and despite noting Jepsen for "her simplicity and directness", felt "The fact that it's often expressed in seemingly direct, if dramatically overstated, elements should deceive no one. These are mythically complex creatures. Don't believe me? Ask a teenage boy."

In the years since its release, various publications such as Time, MTV, Stereogum, and Billboard have labeled the album as underrated. The album was voted as the 10th best album of 2012 by AllMusic. Oricon in Japan ranked the album at number 63 for the year 2013.

Commercial performance
In the United States, the album debuted at number six on the US Billboard 200 chart, selling 46,000 copies in its first week. In the second week, the album dropped to number 20 on the chart, selling an additional 19,000 copies. As of August 2015, the album has sold 292,000 copies in the United States.

In Japan, the album debuted at number four with 29,528 copies sold in its first week. In the second week, the album dropped to number six on the chart, selling 19,022 more copies.

In Canada, the album debuted at five on the Canadian Albums Chart, selling over 8,000 copies in its first week. In the United Kingdom, the album debuted at number nine on the UK Albums Chart. As of September 2015, the album has sold a total 46,067 copies in the UK.

Track listing

A remix album was released exclusively in Japan on June 12, 2013.Notes – additional production
 – co-production
 – vocal production
"Tiny Little Bows" contains an interpolation of "Cupid", written by Sam Cooke.

Credits and personnel
Credits adapted from Kiss at AllMusic.
Lead vocals – Carly Rae Jepsen
Guest vocals – Justin Bieber, Owl City
Background vocals – Colin Janz, Kelsey Janz, The Minneapolis Youth Chorus, Josh Ramsay, Matthew Thiessen
Keyboards – Lukas Hilbert, Max Martin
Guitar – Tavish CroweProduction'
Executive producers: Justin Bieber, Scott "Scooter" Braun and Jonathan Simkin
Vocal producers: Ryan Stewart and Kuk Harrell
Vocal editing: Jon Rezin,
Mastering: Gene Grimaldi
Engineers: Josh Gudwin, Michael Ilbert, Matthew Koma, Josh Ramsay, Ryan Shanahan, Rick Sheppard, Sean Walsh, Ryan Williams and Adam Young
Assistant engineers: Matt LaPlant and Brandon N. Caddell
Mixing: Serban Ghenea, Toby Gad, John Hanes, Josh Gudwin, Dave Ogilvie, Rob Orton, Robert Orton and RedFoo
Assistant mixing: Zach Blackstone, Pedro Dzelme, Miguel Lara, Tim Roberts and Phil Seaford
Programming: Rick Sheppard, Cory Enemy, Toby Gad, Lukas Hilbert, Colin Janz, Max Martin and Rick Sheppard
Instrumentation: Josh Ramsay, Adam Young and Toby Gad
Photography: Reid Rolls and Damien Fry
Art direction and design: Gavin Taylor

Charts

Weekly charts

Year-end charts

Certifications and sales

Release history

References

2012 albums
Carly Rae Jepsen albums
604 Records albums
Interscope Records albums
Schoolboy Records albums
Nu-disco albums
Teen pop albums
Albums produced by Dallas Austin
Albums produced by Josh Abraham
Albums produced by Kuk Harrell
Albums produced by Max Martin
Albums produced by Toby Gad
Albums recorded at Hipposonic Studios
Juno Award for Album of the Year albums
Juno Award for Pop Album of the Year albums

he:Kiss